"123" is a song recorded by Nigerian singer Nikki Laoye for her second studio album The 123 Project (2014). The song was released on July 6, 2012 by Wahala Media Entertainment as the lead single from the album on the platform of the new African music distribution application Spinlet. It was written by Nikki Laoye and produced by her brother Xblaze (Ade Laoye).

Background 

In the summer of 2012 Laoye began working on her sophomore album, she had taken a brief hiatus from music following the loss of her father in 2011. Laoye teamed up with her younger brother and producer Xblaze, who had produced her earlier hits Taka Sufe and No Be Beans; to produce the single 123, which was to be the lead single to her sophomore studio album.

Composition 
"123" is a pop and dance song with elements of Indian drums and thumping bass patterns. In the song Laoye switches from singing in English, to pidgin and yoruba languages. The song's chorus comprises an "oya 1-2-3" vocal hook laced in Laoye's signature harmonies. Lyrically, Laoye sings about letting loose and praising God with a dance.

Critical reception 
The song received generally positive reviews from most music critics. Demola OG of Notjustok.com described "123" as having a "dance feel that you can move to". Priscilla Olubunmi-Awoseyi  of PraiseWorld Radio said 123 "makes the aged nod their heads in rhythm" and "kids wriggle their bodies" she also added that "you just can't sit still when you hear this song".

Commercial performance 
123 peaked at number 7 on the Spinlet Top 10 Best Selling singles of 2013.

Music video 
The music video for "123" was shot on 9 March 2014, at the University of Lagos in Lagos, Nigeria. The video was directed by Tfrizzle for Frizzle and Bizzle Films and filmed on the grounds of the University, predominantly in front of the school library and by the waterfront. On 9 April 2014, Laoye released exclusive behind the scenes photographs from the video shoot, in order to create anticipation towards the release of the video on 11 April 2014.

The outdoor Video depicts Nikki singing and performing a catchy and energetic dance choreography alongside popular Nigerian dance group Alien Nation. It also features an exciting dance battle between Nikki and Steven of Imagneto Dance Company and several cameos from Nigerian entertainers including Kiki Omeili, Essence, J'odie, Ade Laoye, DJ Gosporella, Onos, Anny Ibrahim and Provabs.

Live performances 
Laoye's first major performance of 123 was at the 2013 Crystal Awards event in Lagos. Her performance alongside Alien Nation dance group was tagged as one of the best performances of the night.

Laoye also performed to rave reviews at the Soul Sisters Concert headlined by Mary J. Blige as well as the Mandela Tribute Concert organized by EbonyLife TV in December, 2013.

In December 2014, Laoye performed "123" as a medley at the 2014 Rhythm Unplugged Event, which held at the Eko Hotels and Towers in Lagos, Nigeria. She also performed the song at The Headies 2014 Awards, as she opened the event show alongside the Alien Nation dance group.

Charts

Recognition and awards

|-
| rowspan="2"|2013 || '123'  || Crystal Gospel Awards: Song of the Year ||  
|-
| '123'  || Nigerian Gospel Music Awards: Song of the Year ||  
|-
| 2015 || "123"  || Crystal Gospel Awards: Video of the Year || 
|}

References

2012 singles
2012 songs
Dance-pop songs
Yoruba-language songs
Nikki Laoye songs